1960 presidential election may refer to:

 1960 Bolivian general election
 1960 Brazilian presidential election
 1960 Ghanaian presidential election
 1960 Icelandic presidential election
 March 1960 South Korean presidential election
 August 1960 South Korean presidential election
 1960 United States presidential election